The Hongluo Temple (Chinese: 红螺寺; pinyin: Hongluo Si) is one of the largest and most extensive Buddhist temples located in northern Beijing.  It was first established during the Tang Dynasty (618-907 AD); however, it was rebuilt many times later, notably during the Ming Dynasty.  The temple is located at the southern foot of the Hongluo Mountain, and covers an area of 7 hectares (17 acres).  Its name, Hongluo Temple is also translated as Red Snail Temple.

Notes

Buddhist temples in Beijing